The 2008 Cincinnati Bearcats football team represented the University of Cincinnati in the 2008 NCAA Division I FBS football season. The team, coached by Brian Kelly, played its homes game in Nippert Stadium. Kelly was in his second full season with the Bearcats after coaching them to a 31–21 win against Southern Miss in the 2007 PapaJohns.com Bowl. On Friday, November 28, 2008, the Bearcats clinched a share of the Big East Conference title for the first time since joining the Big East in 2005.  With a victory over Syracuse on November 29, 2008 the Bearcats became the outright football champions of the Big East and set a record with an average attendance of 31,964. After a disappointing loss to Virginia Tech in the 2009 Orange Bowl, the Bearcats finished 17th in the AP Poll for the second consecutive year. With West Virginia falling off Cincinnati became the front runner to win the big east.

Schedule

Rankings

Game summaries

Eastern Kentucky

Oklahoma

Miami

Akron

Marshall

Rutgers

Connecticut

South Florida

West Virginia

Louisville

Pittsburgh

Syracuse

Hawaii

Virginia Tech

Awards and milestones

All-Americans
Kevin Huber, P

Post-season finalists and winners
Ray Guy Award: Punter of the Year - Kevin Huber (finalist)

Big East Conference honors
Special Teams Player of the Year: Mardy Gilyard
Coach of the Year: Brian Kelly

Offensive player of the week
Week 1: Dustin Grutza

Defensive player of the week
Week 10: Aaron Webster

Special teams player of the week
Week 2: Mardy Gilyard
Week 6: Connor Barwin
Week 7: Kevin Huber
Week 10: Mardy Gillard
Week 13: Jacob Rogers

Big East Conference All-Conference First Team

Mardy Gilyard, WR
Mardy Gilyard, KR

Connor Barwin, DL
Mike Mickens, DB
Brandon Underwood, DB
Kevin Huber, P

Big East Conference All-Conference Second Team

Dominick Goodman, WR
Trevor Canfield, OL
Tony Pike, QB

Terrill Byrd, DL

Players in the 2009 NFL Draft

References

Cincinnati
Cincinnati Bearcats football seasons
Big East Conference football champion seasons
Cincinnati Bearcats football